The 3M-54 Kalibr, (Калибр, caliber), also referred to it as 3M54-1 Kalibr, 3M14 Biryuza (Бирюза, turquoise), (NATO reporting name SS-N-27 Sizzler and SS-N-30A) is a family of Russian cruise missiles developed by the Novator Design Bureau (OKB-8). It first saw service in 1994. There are ship-launched, submarine-launched and air-launched versions of the missile, and variants for anti-ship, anti-submarine and land attack use. Some versions have a second propulsion stage that initiates a supersonic sprint in the terminal approach to the target, reducing the time that target's defense systems have to react, while subsonic versions have greater range than the supersonic variants.

Design
The missile is a modular system with five versions: two anti-shipping types, one for land attack and two anti-submarine types. The missile is designed to share common parts between the surface and submarine-launched variants but each missile consists of different components, for example, the booster. The missile can be launched from a surface ship using a vertical launching system (VLS).

It has a booster with thrust vectoring capability. The missile launched from a submarine torpedo tube has no need for such an addition but has a conventional booster instead. The air launched version is held in a container that is dropped as the missile launches, detaching from the container.

There are several claims about the maximum range of Kalibr land attack versions in use by Russia.

Discrepancies in range values may be political declarations for strategic effect, or potentially longer 2,500 km-range claims could be associated with a thermonuclear armed variant while shorter 1,500 km-range estimates are for the conventionally armed missile.

Launch of production of a submarine-variant of the 3M14TE Kalibr-NK called the Kalibr-PL missile occurred in 2012, according to state television news (broadcast of 11.10.2015). Details of this version – a maximum speed of Mach 3, a range of 4,000 km, basing in the air, on land, on water and under water. The missile can make in-flight maneuvers 147 times or more in any direction, it has a minimum height of 10 meters, an average one of 20 – 50 meters (up to 1000 m), it will automatically follow terrain, it can be controlled in flight.

Russia has improved the targeting system of its ship- and submarine-launched Kalibr cruise missiles to improve their ability to conduct time sensitive attacks. Defence Minister Sergei Shoigu revealed the development, which was initiated as a result of combat experience in Syria, in an interview with the Moskovsky Komsomolets newspaper on 22 September 2019.

Terminal supersonic flight

The Russian domestic variant (3M54T / 3M54K) and export variants (3M54TE/3M54KE) fly at sub-sonic speeds while achieving supersonic speed (Mach 3.0) as they near their target. They are also capable of performing very high angled defensive high speed maneuvers in contrast to the common linear flight path of other anti-ship cruise missiles. The terminal speed of these weapons means that modern defense systems have a harder time to repel them and their precision makes them lethal to mobile targets such as destroyers.

Launch platforms 

 'Club-K' – a Russian container complex of missile weapons, placed in the standard 20- and 40-foot sea container. It is designed to defeat surface and ground targets. The complex can be mounted on shorelines, vessels of various classes, rail platforms and trucks. It is a modification of the Kalibr missile system.

Russian submarines of the Kilo class, Lada class, Amur class, Akula class, Yasen class, and Borei class are launch platforms for the missiles.

The Russian Admiral Gorshkov class, Admiral Grigorovich class, and Gepard class frigates are able to carry these missiles. Also the Indian Talwar class frigate is another shipborne launch platform for the Club missile system.

The Russian Gremyashchy class, Buyan-M class, the second batch of Steregushchy class corvettes and the Karakurt class are low displacement platforms with Kalibr system ability.

It is believed by some analysts that an air-launched variant will be developed to arm the Tu-142s currently in service with the Russian navy.

A Club-K variant, which is disguised as a shipping container that can be placed on a truck, train, or merchant vessel, was advertised in 2010 and was shown for the first time at the MAKS 2011 air show. Putting the launcher system into a standard shipping container allows the missiles to be moved and stored without arousing suspicion, which in turn renders pre-emptive strikes against the launcher very difficult.

Operational history

Russian military intervention in the Syrian civil war

 On 7 October 2015, a Gepard class frigate and three Buyan-M class Russian Navy corvettes, part of the Caspian Flotilla launched 26 Kalibr-NK system cruise missiles 3M14T from the Caspian Sea at 11 targets in Syria during the Syrian Civil War. The missiles traveled 1,500 km (932 mi) through Iranian and Iraqi airspace and struck targets in Raqqa and Aleppo provinces (controlled by the Islamic State) but primarily in Idlib province (controlled by the Free Syrian Army and Nusra Front). Anonymous US DoD officials alleged that four missiles crashed in Iran. The US officials offered no evidence while Russian and Iranian governments denied the claim of missile crash. Pentagon and State Department officials refused to comment on the reports. Russia posted video footage of 26 Kalibr missile launches as well as several videos of missile impacts without time or location information.
 On 20 November 2015, Russia launched 18 3M14T cruise missiles from the Caspian Sea onto targets in Syria, the targets were in Raqqa, Idlib and Aleppo.
 On 9 December 2015, Russia fired a group of 3M14K cruise missiles from Kalibr-PL system at positions occupied by ISIL from the Improved Kilo-class submarine B-237 Rostov-on-Don deployed in the Mediterranean.
On 19 August 2016, Russia launched three Kalibr-NK cruise missiles from Buyan-class corvette Zelenyy Dol and Serpukhov deployed in the eastern Mediterranean, and struck al-Nusra targets in the Aleppo province.
On 20 September 2016, Russian state media reported that Russian warships in the Mediterranean fired three Kalibr-NK missiles at western Aleppo, near Mount Simeon. The Russians claimed that the missile strike killed "30 Israeli and Western officers directing the terrorists' attacks in Aleppo and Idlib".
On 15 November 2016, Russian frigate Admiral Grigorovich fired at least three missiles against targets in Idlib and Homs provinces, Syria, in the opening stages of the decisive offensive on Aleppo.
On 31 May 2017, the Russian frigate Admiral Essen and submarine Krasnodar launched four missiles against targets east of Palmyra, Syria.
On 23 June 2017, Russian frigates Admiral Grigorovich and Admiral Essen, and the submarine Krasnodar fired six Kalibr missiles at ISIL arms depot targets in Hama.
On 5 September 2017, the Russian frigate Admiral Essen fired some Kalibr missiles on ISIL targets (command posts, a communications center, a facility repairing armored vehicles, and arms and ammunition depots) as part of an operation to take Deir ez-Zor.
On 14 September 2017, the Russian submarines Veliky Novgorod and Kolpino fired seven Kalibr missiles on ISIL targets (command posts, communications centers and ammunition depots) in the south-east of Deir ez-Zor.
On 22 September 2017, the Russian submarine Veliky Novgorod fired at least three Kalibr missiles on al-Nusra in the Idlib province. The missile strike destroyed command centers, training bases and armored vehicles.
On 5 October 2017, the Russian submarines Veliky Novgorod and Kolpino launched 10 Kalibr missiles. The strikes were to support Syrian troops conducting a ground offensive in Deir-ez-Zor province.
On 31 October 2017, the Russian submarine Veliky Novgorod launched 3 Kalibr missiles. The strikes were again to support Syrian troops conducting a ground offensive in Deir-ez-Zor province.
On 3 November 2017, the Russian submarine Kolpino launched 6 Kalibr missiles from a submerged position. Missiles hit terrorists' strongholds, weapon and ammunition depots, concentrations of militants, and important command centres near Abu Kamal, Deir-ez-Zor.
On 3 February 2018, Russian frigates and submarines active in the Mediterranean sea launched several Kalibr missiles on the positions of rebels in the Idlib province, Syria where the Sukhoi Su-25 attack aircraft of Major Roman Filipov was shot down, killing about 30.

2022 Russian invasion of Ukraine

Kalibr cruise missiles have been widely used by Russian forces since the start of the 2022 Russian invasion of Ukraine on 24 February 2022. The opening assault is said to have included at least 30 cruise missiles, targetting command and control points, air bases, and air-defense batteries. The missiles were likely fired by the Buyan-class corvettes, Admiral Grigorovich-class frigates and Kilo-class submarines of the Russian Black Sea Fleet. Ukraine's military command reported widespread usage of Kalibr cruise missiles in strikes against strategic and non-combat targets across Ukraine. According to military analyst Brent Eastwood, Kalibr is an equivalent to the American Tomahawk missile and can easily overcome Ukrainian air defences. Most notable incidents were:

On 14 July 2022, three Kalibr cruise missiles hit the city center of Vinnytsia, Ukraine, killing at least 20 people, including at least three children. Ukraine claimed two other missiles were shot down.
On 23 July 2022, at least two Kalibr cruise missiles hit the port of Odessa, other two were reportedly shot down.
On 11 September 2022, Kalibr cruise missiles were again fired from the Black Sea on targets in Ukraine. The same day, missile strike on Kharkiv TEC-5 thermal power plant in Kharkiv was confirmed by Ukrainian officials.
During 2022 Russian strikes against Ukrainian infrastructure in October, November and December 2022, number of Kalibr cruise missiles fired from the Black Sea targetted various Ukrainian energy facilities across the country. This led to destruction of at least 50% of Ukraine's energy sector by mid-November 2022.
On 10 October 2022, three Kalibr cruise missiles violated the airspace of the Republic of Moldova.
On 31 October 2022, remains of a Kalibr missile reportedly shot down by Ukrainian air defence crashed in Moldova.

Variants
Domestic variants are basic versions of this missile family; these are the 3M54 and 3M14. The export model is called Club (formerly Klub). There are two major launch platforms: the Kalibr-PL (export Club-S), designed for use from submarines, and the Kalibr-NK (export Club-N), designed for surface ships. These two launch platforms can be equipped with the following warhead and guidance combinations:

Domestic variants
: A submarine-launched anti-shipping variant deployed by the Russian Navy.
 An anti-shipping variant deployed by the Russian Navy on surface ships. Its warhead weight and other performances are the same as the 3M-54K.
 (SS-N-30A) An inertial guidance land attack variant deployed by the Russian Navy. Its subsonic terminal speed is Mach 0.8.
 is the inertial guidance land attack variant which is deployed by the Russian Navy.
 is a new version of Kalibr with larger warhead and extended range to 4,500 km. The ship, submarine, air, and land-launched versions are in development.

Export variants

Club-S
Its range is 300 km; (note that its range is less than the 3M-54).

It is a sea-skimmer with a subsonic terminal speed of 0.8 mach.
 An inertially guided land attack variant; it is launched from a submarine. It has a subsonic terminal speed of 0.8 mach.
 A submarine-launched anti-submarine variant, it consists of two stages, one solid booster with four grid fins and one anti-submarine light torpedo. It can reach Mach 2.5 speed. It is similar to the American ASROC/SUBROC missile/torpedo system.

Club-N
 – A surface vessel with VLS launched anti-shipping variant; with a thrust vectoring booster. Its basic length is 8.9 m, its warhead weight and other performance is the same as the 3M-54E. Its range is less than the 3M-54.
 – A surface ship with VLS anti-shipping variant, with thrust vectoring booster. A sea-skimmer with a subsonic terminal speed of 0.8 mach.
 – An inertially guided land attack variant. It is a surface ship with VLS missile and a thrust vectoring booster.

 – A surface ship with the VLS launched anti-submarine variant; it consists of three stages, one booster with thrust vector nozzle, one conventional booster, and one anti-submarine light torpedo. Speed is Mach 2.

Club-T
Land-based anti-ship (3M-54E2) and land-attack (3M-14E1) self-propelled missile system for coastal defense. Both missile variants in the system arsenal weigh 1,700 kg and feature a 450 kg warhead and flight speed of 240 m/s. According to the manufacturer, in land-attack mode, the system has a CEP of 50 m.

Club-A

 – Air-launched anti-ship variant. Two stages, terminal supersonic speed. Weight 1950 kg. Warhead 200 kg. Range 300 km.
 – Air-launched anti-ship variant. Subsonic.
 – Air-launched land attack variant. Subsonic. INS+satellite guidance. Length 6.2 m. Weight 1400 kg. Warhead 450 kg. Range 300 km.

Operators

:
  uses the 3M14, 3M54, 3M54-1, 91R1, 91RT2. Surface ship launched variants are used by the Gremyashchy class, Karakurt class, Buyan-M class corvettes, Gepard class, Admiral Gorshkov class and the Admiral Grigorovich-class frigates.
: The Algerian National Navy uses the 'Club-S' variant for their Kilo class submarines.
: The Vietnam People's Navy uses the 'Club-S' variant for its six Kilo class submarines.
: The People's Liberation Army Navy uses the 'Club-S' variant for its Kilo class submarines.
: Contradictory sources indicate that the Iranian Navy is thought to have purchased or is about to purchase 'Club-S' missiles for its three Kilo class submarines.

See also

3M-51 Alfa
Atmaca
AV-TM 300
Babur
BGM-109 Tomahawk
BrahMos
Hyunmoo-3
Iskander-K
Khalij Fars
Noor ASCM
P-800 Oniks
Qader
Ra'ad
RK-55
SOM
YJ-18
Zafar

References

External links
 
 Graphics Illustration
 CSIS Missile Threat – SS-N-30
  Producer, corporate WWW
 
 
 
 
 

Anti-ship missiles of Russia
Anti-ship cruise missiles of Russia
Anti-submarine missiles
Air-to-surface missiles of Russia
Surface-to-surface missiles
Submarine-launched cruise missiles of Russia
Post–Cold War weapons of Russia
NPO Novator products
Anti-ship cruise missiles of India
Nuclear cruise missiles of Russia
Military equipment introduced in the 1990s
Military equipment of the 2022 Russian invasion of Ukraine